Army Public School, Agra was established 1 August 1991 by the Army Welfare Education Society (AWES) primarily to cater for the educational facilities for the children of Army personnel. Earlier it was known as Station Sainik School. It is affiliated to Central Board of Secondary Education(CBSE) and runs classes from I to XII.

Vision statement 
Embracing inclusivity APS Agra endeavours to educate al students to the highest levels of academic & co-curricular achievements to help them expand their potential & prepare them to be skilled, productive, responsible, ethical, creative and compassionate members of the society.

Mission statement 
At Army Public School, Agra We shall consciously create an environment of inclusion and encourage faculty development for empowering students to become future ready.

Salient features 
 High Quality education by highly qualified teachers.
 English Medium for imparting education. Stress on spoken english.
 Fully equipped Labs (Physics, Chemistry, Biology, Computer and Math)
 Various subject related quiz competitions at inter school and inter cluster level.
 Entire classrooms are equipped with "Extra Marks" smart classes.

References

External links 
 Army Welfare Education Society Website
 Army Public School, Agra Cantt

Indian Army Public Schools
Primary schools in Uttar Pradesh
High schools and secondary schools in Uttar Pradesh
Education in Agra
Educational institutions established in 1991
1991 establishments in Uttar Pradesh